In computer science, the cell-probe model is a model of computation similar to the random-access machine, except that all operations are free except memory access.  This model is useful for proving lower bounds of algorithms for data structure problems.

Overview 
The cell-probe model is a minor modification of the random-access machine model, itself a minor modification of the counter machine model, in which computational cost is only assigned to accessing units of memory called cells.

In this model, computation is framed as a problem of querying a set of memory cells.  The problem has two phases: the preprocessing phase and the query phase.  The input to the first phase, the preprocessing phase, is a set of data from which to build some structure from memory cells.  The input to the second phase, the query phase, is a query datum.  The problem is to determine if the query datum was included in the original input data set.  Operations are free except to access memory cells.

This model is useful in the analysis of data structures.  In particular, the model clearly shows a minimum number of memory accesses to solve a problem in which there is stored data on which we would like to run some query.  An example of such a problem is the dynamic partial sum problem.

History 
In Andrew Yao's 1981 paper "Should Tables Be Sorted?", Yao described the cell-probe model and used it to give a minimum number of memory cell "probes" or accesses necessary to determine whether a given query datum exists within a table stored in memory.

Formal definition 
Given a set of data  construct a structure consisting of  memory cells, each able to store  bits.  Then when given a query element  determine whether  with correctness  by accessing  memory cells.  Such an algorithm is called an -error -probe algorithm using  cells with word size .

Notable results

Dynamic Partial Sums 

Instead, if the values are stored as leaves in a tree whose inner nodes store the values of the subtree rooted at that node.  In this structure  requires  time to update each node in the leaf to root path, and  similarly requires  time to traverse the tree from leaf to root summing the values of all subtrees left of the query index.

Mihai Pătraşcu used the cell-probe model and an information transfer argument to show that the partial sums problem requires  time per operation.

Approximate Nearest Neighbor Searching 
The exact nearest neighbor search problem is to determine the closest in a set of input points to a given query point.  An approximate version of this problem is often considered since many applications of this problem are in very high dimension spaces and solving the problem in high dimensions requires exponential time or space with respect to the dimension.

This proof used the cell-probe model and information theoretic techniques for communication complexity.

External links 
 NIST's Dictionary of Algorithms and Data Structures entry on the cell-probe model

References 

Register machines
Models of computation